This is a glossary for the terminology in a mathematical field of functional analysis.

Throughout the article, unless stated otherwise, the base field of a vector space is the field of real numbers or that of complex numbers. Algebras are not assumed to be unital.

See also: List of Banach spaces.

*

A

B

C

D

F

G

H

I

K

L

N

O

P

Q

R

S

T

U

W

References 

 
 Bourbaki, Espaces vectoriels topologiques
  
 M. Takesaki, Theory of Operator Algebras I, Springer, 2001, 2nd printing of the first edition 1979.

Further reading 
Antony Wassermann's lecture notes at http://iml.univ-mrs.fr/~wasserm/
Jacob Lurie's lecture notes on a von Neumann algebra at https://www.math.ias.edu/~lurie/261y.html

Functional analysis